Duinrell is an amusement park situated in Wassenaar, Netherlands. It contains a caravan park and a camp-site. The Park holds a variety of accommodations. Some other things that are available include lodges, tents and static caravans. The park provides bikes and karts available for rent. Duinrell has been critically acclaimed for its attraction park with swimming pool (the ), which has the longest waterslides in the Netherlands. The park has a mascot named Rick the Frog.

The park is located on the estate of the counts Van Zuylen van Nijevelt.

History 
Head here for the full history on Duinrell.

As early as 1646 there was a farm in Wassenaar: the Duinrell farm. A large estate surrounded it, which since 1935 has been developed into the holiday and amusement park that, by now, is enjoyed by over a million people every year. Go back in time with us and discover the multi-faceted history of Duinrell.

References

External links

Amusement parks in the Netherlands
Buildings and structures in South Holland
Tourist attractions in South Holland
1935 establishments in the Netherlands
Wassenaar
Amusement parks opened in 1935
20th-century architecture in the Netherlands